Sana Safi (ثنا ساپۍ - born 1989) is an Afghan broadcast journalist, currently working for BBC World Service

Early life
Sana Safi was born in Kabul and brought up in Kandahar, Helmand, in Nangarhar, and in other cities in Afghanistan. Safi left Afghanistan in 2007 and by 2014 was living in the United Kingdom. She is fluent in Pashto, Dari, and English.

Career
Safi lives in London where she works for the BBC. She started her career as a presenter/producer for a children's programme in the eastern Afghan city of Jalalabad before joining the BBC Afghan's Afghan Woman Hour programme and main current affairs transmissions later.

She is currently a presenter for BBC Pashto's TV show which is a half-hour show, made up of local, regional, and international news. Safi was the first journalist to speak to Afghanistan's Lebanese-American First Lady Rula Ghani in her first broadcast interview, after her husband Ashraf Ghani Ahmadzai took office.

Alongside Safi's journalistic work, she is known for writing fiction. She writes mainly short stories, widely published in her native country of Afghanistan. Her stories tell the tale of a young independent Muslim woman who knows all about the secrets of her country of origin and traditions and is also very much integrated into western society.

Safi tells the contrasting features of East and West and the similarities of human kind. Considering her background and upbringing, Safi does not shy away from some fundamental social issues in her stories. She has written about a wide range of topics, from sexual, and physical violence against women, to the dating, socializing and daily life of a young westerner.

See also 
Afghans in the United Kingdom

References

External links
 Sana Safi's Short Stories published in this widely read Afghan Website (non-English)
 BBC Website which contains Sana's work (non-English)
 Official Blog(non-English)

1989 births
Living people
Afghan television journalists
Afghan women television journalists
Afghan television presenters
BBC newsreaders and journalists
British women television journalists
BBC World News
BBC World Service people
21st-century British women writers
Afghan women short story writers
Afghan short story writers
Pashtun women
21st-century short story writers
20th-century Afghan women writers
20th-century Afghan writers
British women radio presenters
Afghan radio presenters
Afghan women radio presenters
British women television presenters
Afghan women television presenters
British women radio journalists
Afghan women radio journalists